Fatima Bashir (born 8 January, 1995) is a Nigerian judoka who competes in the women's category. She  won a bronze medal at the 2015 All-Africa Games in the 48kg category.

Sports career 
Fatima Bashir won a bronze medal in the women's 48kg event at the 2015 All-Africa Games held in Brazzaville, Republic of the Congo.

References 

1995 births
Living people
Nigerian female judoka
African Games medalists in judo
African Games bronze medalists for Nigeria
Competitors at the 2015 African Games
20th-century Nigerian women
21st-century Nigerian women